The 2016 Big 12 Conference baseball tournament was held from May 25 through 29 at Chickasaw Bricktown Ballpark in Oklahoma City, Oklahoma.  The annual tournament determined the conference champion of the Division I Big 12 Conference for college baseball.  The TCU Horned Frogs won the Tournament Championship, and as the winner of the tournament, TCU earned the league's automatic bid to the 2016 NCAA Division I baseball tournament.

The tournament has been held since 1997, the inaugural year of the Big 12 Conference.  Among current league members, Texas has won the most championships with five.  Among original members, Baylor and Kansas State have never won the event.  Iowa State discontinued their program after the 2001 season without having won a title.  Having joined in 2013, TCU won their first title in 2014 while West Virginia has yet to win the Tournament.

The newest conference members, TCU and West Virginia, faced each other in the Championship game. Earlier in the season, TCU swept the regular season series over West Virginia. The Frogs won the 2014 Big 12 Tournament championship, and the Mountaineers' appearance in the tournament finale marked the first time since 1996 that WVU had played for a conference tournament championship. TCU won the championship game 11–10 in 10 innings.

Format and seeding
The top eight finishers from the regular season will be seeded one through eight, and will then play a two-bracket double-elimination tournament leading to a winner-take-all championship game.

Results

All-Tournament Team
Source:

References

Tournament
Big 12 Conference Baseball Tournament
Big 12 Conference baseball tournament
Big 12 Conference baseball tournament
Baseball competitions in Oklahoma City
College sports tournaments in Oklahoma